Ctenucha aymara is a moth of the family Erebidae. It was described by William Schaus in 1892. It is found in Peru.

References

aymara
Moths described in 1892